Talhae of Silla (5 BC –80 AD, r. 57–80) was the fourth king of Silla, one of the Three Kingdoms of Korea. He is commonly called Talhae Isageum, isageum being the royal title in early Silla. Also known by his personal name as Seok Tal-hae (昔脫解).

Family 
Parents
Father: King Hamdalpa (함달파왕)
Mother: Princess Jignyeongug (직녀국 공주)
Consorts and their respective issue: 
Queen  Ahyo, of the Park clan (아효부인 박씨), daughter of Namhae of Silla and Lady Unje, sister of Yuri Isageum
Son: Crown Prince Seok Gu-chu (태자 석구추)
Daughter-in-law: Queen Jijinaelye of the Kim clan (지진내례부인 김씨)
Son: Beolhyu of Silla (died 196, r. 184–196)–was the 9th king of Silla, one
Adopted Son or Great-grandfather: Kim Alji

Background 
He was a member of the Gyeongju Seok clan, one of the noble clans that shared the Silla throne during the early Common Era.

He was born in a small kingdom 1000 li northeast of Wa (Japan).  (The name of the kingdom is Dapana-guk 다파나국 多婆那國 "Dapana Country" according to Samguk Sagi, or Ryongseong-guk 룡성국 龍城國 "Dragon Castle/City Country," Jeongmyeong-guk 正明國 "Proper and Enlightened Country," Wanha-guk 琓夏國 "(A Kind of) Jade Summer Country," or Hwaha-guk 花厦國 "Flower Mansion Country" according to Samguk Yusa.) His father, King Hamdalpa, was a king of this kingdom; his mother was a queen or princess of another kingdom, called Nyeo-guk 女国 "Woman Country."

According to the Samguk Sagi, when he was born as an egg, his father considered it an ill omen and had it boxed and floated at sea. The egg landed east of Gyerim (near today's Gyeongju, South Korea), where he was raised by an old woman as a fisherman. His family is said to have taken over a high official's house by claiming to be metalsmiths.

His birth year is unknown, but he was probably an old man when he assumed the throne, having married the daughter (or younger sister) of King Namhae of Silla in the year 8 AD. He was offered the throne as successor to the second king Namhae, but the older Yuri served as king first. Yuri in turn designated Tal-hae his successor.

Hogong is chief retainer who served for establishment of Silla. He also discovered Kim Alji who is the founder of Kim clan in Korea. He got involved to three royals who are founder of Silla. He has Japanese origin. Tal-hae also came over by ship. The location of his birth place Dapana Country is estimated as somewhere in the Japanese archipelago. It is precisely estimated some part in Sea of Japan side or Kyushu. According to Kenichi Kamigaito, as it is a myth, other lines would be mixed, but Tal-hae of Silla was a King of Tanba province and he made jade there. He reached Silla by following a trade route. Even though excluding details of myth, it can be assumed that clan Seok had trade with Japan.

On the other hand, there is a view that Ryongseong-guk listed in Samguk yusa has been regarded as a nation of Ainu, and Tal-hae has been regarded as a citizen of Ainu.

Legend

Reign 
In 64, the rival Korean kingdom Baekje attacked several times. Silla battled the Gaya confederacy in 77.

According to legend, in 65 the infant Kim Alji, ancestor of the Gyeongju Kim family, was found by Hogong in a golden box in the royal Gyerim forest. Tal-hae named his kingdom Gyerim at this time (the name Silla was officially adopted much later).

A tomb believed to be Tal-hae's is located in northern Gyeongju City. The Gyeongju National Museum is constructed on the site where Tal-hae had a palace built.

In popular culture
Portrayed by Lee Pil-mo in the 2010 MBC TV series Kim Su-ro, The Iron King.

See also 
 Rulers of Korea
 Three Kingdoms of Korea
 History of Korea
Kim Su-ro, The Iron King

Notes 
 A li is roughly equivalent to 400–500 meters.

 Tanba no kuni was located 460 km northeast of Wakoku (::zh:倭国, :ja:倭国).

References

External links 
 The Academy of Korean Studies
 Korea Britannica

Silla rulers
Silla
80 deaths
1st-century monarchs in Asia
Year of birth unknown
1st-century Korean people